Reginbert may refer to:

Reginbert of Reichenau (d. 848), monk and librarian
 (d. 964), legendary founder of Saint Blaise Abbey, Black Forest
 (d. 1140), bishop of Brixen
Reginbert of Hagenau (d. 1148), bishop of Passau

See also
Raginpert, king of the Lombards (701)